Thomas Osborne Stock (1822 – 17 November 1875) was an Irish Liberal politician.

He was elected as the Member of Parliament (MP) for Carlow Borough at the 1865 general election but stood down at the next general election, in 1868.

References

External links
 

1822 births
1875 deaths
Irish Liberal Party MPs
Members of the Parliament of the United Kingdom for County Carlow constituencies (1801–1922)
UK MPs 1865–1868